Black Spring refers to the 2003 crackdown on Cuban dissidents. The government imprisoned 75 dissidents, including 29 journalists,  as well as librarians, human rights activists, and democracy activists,  on the basis that they were acting as agents of the United States by accepting aid from the US government. Although Amnesty International adopted 75 Cubans as prisoners of conscience, according to Cuba "the 75 individuals arrested, tried and sentenced in March/April 2003 ... who were jailed are demonstrably not independent thinkers, writers or human rights activists, but persons directly in the pay of the US government ... those who were arrested and tried were charged not with criticizing the government, but for receiving American government funds and collaborating with U.S diplomats."

The crackdown on grassroots activists began on 18 March and lasted two days, coordinated with the US invasion of Iraq for minimum publicity.

The crackdown received sharp international condemnation, with critical statements coming from the George W. Bush administration, the European Union, the United Nations and various human rights groups, including Amnesty International. Responding to the crackdown, the European Union imposed sanctions on Cuba in 2003, that were lifted in January 2008. The European Union declared that the arrests "constituted a breach of the most elementary human rights, especially as regards freedom of expression and political association".

All of the dissidents were eventually released, most of whom were exiled to Spain starting in 2010.

Imprisoned people 

Manuel Vázquez Portal received the International Press Freedom Award in 2003. Héctor Maseda Gutiérrez received the same prize in 2008, while locked up in a maximum-security prison.

List of 75 jailed dissidents and their prison sentences:

Nelson Aguiar Ramírez 13 years
Osvaldo Alfonso Valdés 18 years
Pedro Pablo Alvarez Ramos 25 years
Pedro Argüelles Morán 20 years
Víctor Rolando Arroyo Carmona 26 years
Mijail Barzaga Lugo 15 years
Oscar Elías Biscet González 25 years
Margarito Broche Espinosa 25 years
Marcelo Cano Rodríguez 18 years
Roberto de Miranda Hernández 20 years
Carmelo Díaz Fernández 15 years
Eduardo Díaz Fleitas 21 years
Antonio Díaz Sánchez 20 years
Alfredo Domínguez Batista 14 years
Oscar Espinosa Chepe 20 years
Alfredo Felipe Fuentes 26 years
Efrén Fernández Fernández 12 years
Adolfo Fernández Sainz 15 years
José Daniel Ferrer García 25 years
Luis Enrique Ferrer García 28 years
Orlando Fundora Alvarez 18 years
Próspero Gaínza Agüero 25 years
Miguel Galván Gutiérrez 26 years
Julio César Gálvez Rodríguez 15 years
Edel José García Díaz 15 years
José Luis García Paneque 24 years
Ricardo Gonzales Alfonso 20 years
Diosdado González Marrero 20 years
Léster González Pentón 20 years
Alejandro González Raga 14 years
Jorge Luis González Tanquero 20 years
Leonel Grave de Peralta 20 years
Iván Hernández Carrillo 25 years
Normando Hernández González 25 years
Juan Carlos Herrera Acosta 20 years
Regis Iglesias Ramírez 18 years
José Ubaldo Izquierdo Hernandez 16 years
Reinaldo Labrada Peña 6 years
Librado Linares García 20 years
Marcelo López Bañobre 15 years
José Miguel Martínez Hernández 13 years
Héctor Maseda Gutiérrez 20 years
Mario Enrique Mayo Hernández 20 years
Luis Milán Fernández 13 years
Nelson Moliné Espino 20 years
Angel Moya Acosta 20 years
Jesús Mustafá Felipe 25 years
Felix Navarro Rodríguez 25 years
Jorge Olivera Castillo 18 years
Pablo Pacheco Avila 20 years
Héctor Palacios Ruíz 25 years
Arturo Pérez de Alejo Rodríguez 20 years
Omar Pernet Hernández 25 years
Horacio Piña Borrego 20 years
Fabio Prieto Llorente 20 years
Alfredo Pulido López 14 years
José Gabriel Ramón Castillo 20 years
Arnaldo Ramos Lauzerique 18 years
Blas Giraldo Reyes Rodríguez 25 years
Raúl Rivero Castañeda 20 years
Alexis Rodríguez Fernández 15 years
Omar Rodríguez Saludes 27 years
Marta Beatriz Roque Cabello 20 years
Omar Moisés Ruiz Hernández 18 years
Claro Sánchez Altarriba 18 years
Ariel Sigler Amaya 20 years
Guido Sigler Amaya 20 years
Ricardo Enrique Silva 10 years
Fidel Suárez Cruz 20 years
Manuel Ubals González 20 years
Julio Antonio Valdés Guevara 20 years
Miguel Valdés Tamayo 15 years
Héctor Raúl Valle Hernández 12 years
Manuel Vázquez Portal 18 years
Antonio Augusto Villareal Acosta 15 years

Related movements
The wives of imprisoned activists, led by Laura Pollán, formed a movement called Ladies in White. The movement received the Sakharov Prize for Freedom of Thought from the European Parliament in 2005.

See also
 Cuban dissidents

References

External links
 Cuba's Long Black Spring - A report by the committee to Protect Journalists
 Interviews (video) with imprisoned dissidents who were released to Spain
 Spring Nightmare - Manuel Vázquez Portal, an imprisoned Cuban writer, poet, and journalist, describes the prison conditions.

Censorship in Cuba
Political repression in Cuba
History of Cuba
2003 in Cuba